Carnarvon Airport  is an airport at Carnarvon, Western Australia. The airport is publicly owned, meaning that the local government, Shire of Carnarvon, controls it.

Airlines and destinations

Former Airlines
The following airlines have served this airport in the past:
 Virgin Australia Regional Airlines (formally known as Skywest)
 Skippers Aviation
 Ansett

See also
 List of airports in Western Australia
 Aviation transport in Australia

References

External links
 Airservices Aerodromes & Procedure Charts

Airports in Western Australia
Shire of Carnarvon